The 1897–98 Harvard Crimson men's ice hockey season was the inaugural season of play for the program.

Season
Over the previous few years Harvard had played 'ice polo' with Frederick Goodridge captaining the team. For the 1897-98 season the players switched to ice hockey and the team played its first game January 19, losing 0–6 against Brown.

Note: Harvard University did not formally adopt Crimson as its moniker until 1910 but the student body had uniformly been associated with the color since 1875.

Roster

Standings

Schedule and Results

|-
!colspan=12 style=";" | Regular Season

References

Harvard Crimson men's ice hockey seasons
Harvard
Harvard
Harvard
Harvard
Harvard